Laguna Honda may refer to:

 Laguna Honda, San Francisco, a neighborhood of Forest Hill
 Laguna Honda Reservoir